Partille is a former urban area in the county of Västra Götaland in Sweden. It is the seat of Partille Municipality.

References

External links

Populated places in Västra Götaland County